Carex tangii is a tussock-forming perennial in the family Cyperaceae. It is native to north eastern parts of the China.

See also
 List of Carex species

References

tangii
Plants described in 1932
Taxa named by Georg Kükenthal
Flora of China